Chand Bagh, or Chandbagh, may refer to 

Chand Bagh School, an independent boarding school for boys in Pakistan
The Chand Bagh campus, home of the Doon School of Dehradun, India
The Chand Bagh estate, home of the Isabella Thoburn College of Lucknow, India